Mount Hope is a historic home located near New Baltimore, Fauquier County, Virginia. The house was built in four periods from the early-19th to early-20th centuries.  The main dwelling is a 2 ½-story, three-bay, frame dwelling on a stone foundation and in the Greek Revival style. It features a double-story porch with a hipped roof and square wooden columns. Also on the property are the contributing bank barn, a machine shed, a smokehouse, and a spring house dating from the 19th century; an early-20th-century shed; a well; and the Hunton Family cemetery.

It was listed on the National Register of Historic Places in 2006.

References

Houses on the National Register of Historic Places in Virginia
Greek Revival houses in Virginia
Houses completed in 1829
Houses in Fauquier County, Virginia
National Register of Historic Places in Fauquier County, Virginia